Bade Bacheli is a town and a Nagar Palika in Dantewada district  in the state of Chhattisgarh, India. It is now very well known as NMDC Township with nature all around to explore and witness. It is situated roughly 400 km from Raipur, capital of Chhattisgarh. The way to travel is by Road with frequent bus service from Raipur, Bhilai, Jagdalpur, and Hyderabad, Visakhapatnam or by train from Jagdalpur and Vishakhapatnam.

Demographics
 India census, Bade Bacheli had a population of 21,435 of which 11,071 are males while 10,364 are females as per the report released by Census India 2011.

The population of children aged 0–6 is 2796, or 13.04% of the total population of Bade Bacheli (M). In Bade Bacheli Municipality, the female sex ratio is 936 against the state average of 991. Moreover, the child sex ratio in Bade Bacheli is around 1028 compared with the Chhattisgarh state average of 969. The literacy rate of Bade Bacheli city is around 68.05%, 14,587 total literates, of which 8,373 are male and 6,214 female (2011 census). In Bade Bacheli, male literacy is around 75.63% while the female literacy rate is 59.96%.

Bade Bacheli Municipality has total administration over 5,398 houses to which it supplies basic amenities like water and sewerage. It is also authorized to build roads within the Municipality limits and impose taxes on properties coming under its jurisdiction.

The population has raised primarily after the commissioning of the National Mineral Development Corporation (Government Organization)project here.

Points of interest
Local points of interest include:

 Ghadi Chowk, which showcases the "tribal and cultural wealth" of Bastar, situated in the centre of Bacheli town.

 HighTech Park (Baludyan) and Ambedkar park with amusement activities and decoration in the city.

 Iron ore deposits (10&11A,5) under National Mineral Development Corporation, hills and unique technique to crush iron to extract the ore.

 Akashnagar, a small residential place in the hills.

 Lingeswar Temple known for its architectural structure and history.

 The Essar Steel Slurry beneficiation plant situated in Kirandul is 10 km away from Bacheli Township and is used to transport iron ore through Slurry pipeline to Essar Steel’s pellet plant facility in Visakhapatnam. It has its own helipad.

 Ramabooti Temple is situated in Kirandul 11B Deposit, 10 km away from Bacheli Township.

 The local mountain range is known for its deposits of iron ore. Total 14 reserves have been discovered in this range out of which the mining activities are going on in 3 deposits.

 Palnar -the first cashless village in Chhattisgarh is some 34 km away from Bacheli.

References

External links

Cities and towns in Dantewada district